Hnat Tykhonovych Honcharenko (Гнат Тихонович Гончаренко, 1835–c. 1917) was one of the most renowned Ukrainian kobzars (blind itinerant minstrels) of the Kharkiv oblast of the late 19th and early 20th centuries.

Biography 

Honcharenko was born in the village of Ripky into a serf family. He became blind at the age of 3 or 4. He began to study the bandura at the age of 22 under the old kobzar Petro Kulibaba. He studied for a period of four months, and continued his studies under other kobzars he later met.

After he married, he settled not far from Kharkiv on the Hubayenko homestead. When he was widowed, he resettled to Sevastopol with his son, a railway engineer. Honcharenko would spend his winters there and return to Kharkiv for the summer months.

Honcharenko had in his repertoire four dumy, epic poems set to music:

 Oleksiy Popovych
 The Poor Widow and Her Three Sons
 The Sister and Brother
 About the Escape of the three brothers from Oziv

He also sang numerous satirical-humorous songs and played instrumental dance melodies.

On the pages of the press, Hnat Honcharenko was first mentioned by M. Sumtsov in 1885. In the January edition of "Kievan Antiquities" in the article "About a new variant of Olexiy Popovych" he wrote, that Honcharenko had visited Kharkiv numerous times and that he knew numerous sacred and humorous songs, as well as dumy "About the Escape of the three brothers from Oziv" and the "Poor widow".

The first recordings of dumy made from Honcharenko were made by Yu. Tykhovsky in 1899. These recordings were given to the organizers of the XIIth Archeological conference, but unfortunately were not published. Tykhovsky noted that Honcharenko was quiet and unassuming, that he played very well and sang distinctly, and that "it would be very nice to record from him his melodies and the musical accompaniment of the dumy".

Hnat Khotkevych regarded Honcharenko's performances very highly: "he is one of the most educated of all the kobzars. His appearance leaves an impression similar to a magical feeling. He, like his colleagues, wandered from village to village, singing at marketplaces and streets, but what is first observed is his cleanliness and outward appearance.... It could be assumed that he was like this at home, that he is always like this, and not just for the observer's eye.... As a virtuoso, with a limited repertoire. He did not have messy parts in his playing. Everything was performed clearly and artistically."

In 1908 Lesia Ukrainka, with her husband Klyment Kvitka, recorded on phonograph the singing of Hnat Honcharenko and these wax cylinders were sent to Filaret Kolessa in Lviv for transcription.

Filaret Kolessa stated:

Honcharenko's technique demonstrated true artistry. The tones from his fingers come out clearly and loudly, evenly played scalic passages changing from p to f, sounding clear chords at the end of periods and discreetly becoming quiet during his singing, giving a harmonic foundation for his recitation, or intertwining with the golden tapestry of fine fiorituras of his passages.... This is not simple accompaniment by repetition of 2-3 chords but an independent accompaniment copying the motives of the recitation, improvised in the same manner, like singing, and very lively: it gives the recitation a multicolored movement and lifted his expression of his musical declamation....

...Despite his limited repertoire, Honcharenko with his archaic method of recitation and bandura playing sets himself apart from the other live kobzars. He sings dumy in a quick recitation, clearly defining the accents, generally in his singing musical declamation takes precedence over the melodic element, the ancient dorian mode, with two melodic centres, with fourth and fifth groupings of the melody, the ending of the melody on the second degree of the scale, these are archaic characteristics, that distinguish Honcharenko as a singer of the old school, the inheritor of the best kobzar traditions...

...Looking at the recordings of his recitations made on phonograph, with his mastery accompaniments, we have the basis to feel that both Ostap Veresai and Hnat Honcharenko were two of the greatest kobzars that we have known.

Honcharenko died sometime around 1917. A more accurate date has not been ascertained.

Students 
Horobetz
Petro Drevchenko
Erast Udiansky
Hryhory Bajdykov
Mykola Demchenko
Pavlo Hashchenko
Ivan Kuchuhura Kucherenko

See also
Ukrainian folk music

Sources 
 Mishalow, V. and M. (1986). Ukrayins’ki kobzari-bandurysty (Ukrainian Kobzars-Bandurists). Sydney, Australia.
 Humeniuk, A. (1967). Ukrayins’ki narodni muzychni instrumenty (Ukrainian folk musical instruments), p 79. Kiev, Ukraine.

1835 births
1910s deaths
Year of death uncertain
Bandurists
Kobzars
Ukrainian musicians
Blind musicians